The 2009 ICC Champions Trophy was a One Day International cricket tournament held in South Africa between 22 September and 5 October, at Wanderers Stadium and Centurion Park, both in the Gauteng province. Originally, the tournament was scheduled to be hosted by Pakistan in 2008, but due to security concerns it shifted to South Africa. It was the sixth ICC Champions Trophy, and was previously known as the ICC Knock-out. Two teams from two groups of four qualified for the semi-finals, and the final was staged in Centurion on 5 October. Australia successfully defended the title by beating New Zealand by six wickets in the final.

History
The Champions Trophy was the brainchild of Jagmohan Dalmiya, who was ICC president in the late 1990s. It had a dual aim of spreading the game to emerging nations and raising money for the ICC in between World Cups, thus enabling it to pump more cash into those fledgling cricket countries. The first tournament, labelled as a mini World Cup, was staged in Dhaka in October 1998 and raised more than £10 million. The second, in Nairobi, was a commercial success although the crowds stayed away. By the time the 2002 event was held – and there was disquiet as it was so close to the World Cup five months later – the idea of playing in developing nations had been ditched and as revenue-generation was the main raison d'etre, it needed to be in one of the main countries as this allowed the format to be expanded. In 2004 the jamboree moved to England and it became clear the format of group games led to too many meaningless games. By the time the 2006 tournament in India came into view, the event was under fire from some quarters, and at one time there were even hints that India might decline to take part in 2008.

Schedule and location
The tournament was originally scheduled to be held in Pakistan between 11 and 28 September 2008 in Lahore and Karachi. The ICC postponed the tournament due to security fears expressed by several participating countries; On 24 July 2008, the International Cricket Council (ICC) announced that the tournament would take place in Pakistan after all despite players from Australia, England, South Africa and New Zealand raising concerns over touring the country. On 22 August 2008, South Africa announced that it would not take part in the Champions Trophy due to security concerns. Two days later, on 24 August 2008, after speculation that the tournament would be held elsewhere (England, Sri Lanka, or South Africa), the ICC announced that the tournament would be postponed until October 2009.

At its meeting in February 2009, the ICC board decided to move the tournament out of Pakistan on security concerns. At the time, Sri Lanka was the favoured alternate host. In March 2009, the ICC Chief Executives' Committee recommended to the ICC board that the tournament be held in South Africa as there were concerns that the weather in Sri Lanka during September and October could result in too many games being washed out. The ICC board ratified the recommendation, and the event took place in South Africa between 22 September and 5 October 2009.

Venues 
Wanderers Stadium and Centurion Park, both in the Johannesburg area, were announced as venues for the tournament.

Rules and regulations
The 2009 ICC Champions Trophy was contested by the top eight teams (previously 10) that had been seeded and divided into two groups. No associates nations participated in this tournament. Each team played every other team in its group once. Points were allocated for each match in accordance with the system described below which applied throughout the competition. Following the group stage, the top two teams from each group progressed to the semi-finals, where the winner of Group A played the runner up of Group B (in the 1st semi-final) and the winner of Group B played the runner up of Group A (in the 2nd semi-final). The winners of the semi-finals contested the final.

Points system

Squads

Group stage

Group A

The top 2 teams qualified for the Knockout stage
 Advanced to Knockout stage

Group B

The top 2 teams qualified for the Knockout stage
 Advanced to Knockout stage

Knockout stage

Semi-finals

Final

Statistics

Batting
Most runs

Bowling
Most wickets

See also
ICC Champions Trophy

References

External links
Official website
Tournament schedule at Cricinfo.com

 
ICC Champions Trophy tournaments
Champions Trophy
Champions Trophy
Cricket
ICC Champions Trophy
ICC Champions Trophy